The second season of the American post-apocalyptic drama series Black Summer was released by Netflix on June 17, 2021, with 8 episodes. The series is produced by The Asylum, the same production company behind Z Nation, is written and directed primarily by John Hyams, and featured 4 starring roles, most notably being Jaime King in the lead role as Rose, and Zoe Marlett as her daughter Anna. Other stars in the season include Justin Chu Cary & Christine Lee.

Episodes

Cast and characters

Starring 
 Jaime King as Rose, a woman who is now reunited with her daughter Anna, and is now trying her best to stay alive alongside her in the cold
 Justin Chu Cary as Julius James, a man who is mostly on his own and has a grudge against Rose for leaving him for dead after injuring his leg
 Christine Lee as Ooh "Sun" Kyungsun, a Korean woman who is now a prisoner of Ray Nazeri and who was previously a member of Rose’s group
 Zoe Marlett as Anna, Rose’s daughter who she tries to protect

Recurring 
 Bobby Naderi as Ray Nazeri, a former police officer leading his own group
 Manuel Rodriguez-Saenz as Boone, a talkative man who knows the mountain area
 G. Michael Gray as Freddy, a man whose family encounters Rose and Anna
 Dakota Daulby as Sonny, Freddy's aggressive younger brother
 Travis Friesen as Mark, a man in contact with a plane which drops supplies
 Kumiko Konishi as Rhonda, Mark’s wife
 Linda Kee as Sophie, a member of a group in conflict with Nazeri's group who later joins Nazeri
 Jesse Lipscombe as Mance, a member of Sophie's group
 Chantelle Han as Jase, a member of Sophie's group
 Elaine Yang as Natalie, a member of Sophie's group
 Duff Zayonce as Sam, a member of Nazeri's group who encounters Sophie's group

Unnamed Characters
 Brenda Robins as Freddy and Sonny's mother
 Joe Perry as a member of Nazeri's group
 Owen Crow Shoe as a member of Sophie's group
 Andrew Misle, Cliff Liknes and John Dylan Louie as members of another group which comes into conflict with Nazeri

Guest
 Kelsey Flower as Lance, a young survivor with no family and a former member of Rose’s group
 Bechir Sylvain as Braithwaite, a man who knew Spears before the apocalypse
 Daniel Diemer as Luke, an acquaintance of Sophie who encounters Lance
 James Yi as The Pilot, the pilot of the plane which drops supplies

Reception 

On Rotten Tomatoes, the second season has an approval rating of 100% based on 8 reviews, with an average rating of 7.5/10.

Production

Development
On November 20, 2019, Netflix renewed the series for an 8 episode second season. Netflix announced on September 28, 2020 that production of season 2 was underway following a months-long shutdown due to the COVID-19 pandemic.

Filming
Filming for the second season originally began in early 2020 but on March 18, 2020 production was postponed for 2 weeks. The pandemic took hold and the show was put on temporary hiatus.

Filming once again commenced in High River, Alberta in early September 2020.

References 

2021 American television seasons